I Wayan Koster (born 20 October 1962) is an Indonesian politician who is the 10th governor of Bali. Before becoming governor, he was a member of the People's Representative Council representing the province.

A three-term parliamentarian representing his home province, Koster studied at Bandung Institute of Technology and Jakarta State University before becoming a lecturer and eventually joining PDI-P.

Background
Koster was born in the town of Singaraja on 20 October 1962. He completed his first twelve years of education there from 1968, graduating high school in 1980. Afterward, he moved to Bandung to study at the Bandung Institute of Technology, from where he graduated in 1987 with a bachelor's degree in mathematics. Later on, he received a masters from the International Golden Institute (1995) and a doctorate from Jakarta State University (1999).

Career
After earning his bachelor's degree, Koster worked at the Ministry of Education and Culture as a researcher between 1988 and 1995. He then became a non-permanent lecturer at Tarumanegara University, Pelita Harapan University, Jakarta State University and an economic institute.

Parliament
By 2003, Koster was a specialist staff member in PDI-P. In 2004, he ran for a seat in the People's Representative Council as part of PDI-P. During the campaigning process, he headed a committee for a rally supporting the party in his hometown. Participants of the rally clashed with that of another rally supporting Golkar, resulting in two deaths from the latter group. Koster received a civil suit due to his position. Regardless, Koster secured a seat in the parliament after the 2004 election, and was sworn in on 1 October that year.

After being reelected in 2009 with 185,901 votes, Koster was investigated by the Corruption Eradication Commission several times during his second term. He was questioned in 2011 regarding a case in the education ministry, in 2013 regarding another case related to the National Sports Week, and in 2014 about the cases of Akil Mochtar and the Hambalang sports complex. He was reelected for a third term in 2014, winning 260,342 votes. This was the most votes for Bali candidates and the third-most votes won by a parliamentary candidate nationally, after fellow PDI-P members Karolin Margret Natasa and Puan Maharani.

During most of his time in parliament, Koster was part of the tenth commission covering education, culture, sports, tourism, and the creative economy. He had voiced opposition against a 2014 law that would alter the selection of the parliamentary speaker from appointment by the largest party in an election to that of a parliamentary vote. He also voiced his support for a law which would allow Balinese villages to pick between being a "cultural village" or a standard village. He was eventually retasked to the fifth commission on public works, transportation and rural development.

Governor of Bali
In 2018, Koster ran in the gubernatorial elections for Bali, resigning from his parliament seat in order to do so. Running with Tjok Oka Artha Ardhana Sukawati, the pair won with 57.68 percent of the votes. He was sworn in on 5 September 2018.

During the campaigning period, Koster stated that he wished to alter the family planning program in Bali by changing the recommended number of children from two to four in order to fit Balinese traditions.

Koster announced a ban on plastic, as stipulated in Gubernatorial Regulation (Pergub) No. 97/2018, expressing hope that the policy would lead to a 70 percent decline in Bali's marine plastics within a year. In 2021, he was one of twelve individuals named in a suit by the International Society for Krishna Consciousness (ISKCON, known locally as the "Hare Krishna") for allegedly hindering worship activities.

References

1962 births
Governors of Bali
Living people
People from Buleleng Regency
Indonesian Hindus
Balinese people
Members of the People's Representative Council, 2004
Members of the People's Representative Council, 2009
Members of the People's Representative Council, 2014
Bandung Institute of Technology alumni
Jakarta State University alumni